ALW may refer to:

 Allens West railway station, Eaglescliffe, North East England
 Walla Walla Regional Airport in Walla Walla, Washington
 Alternative Liste Wien, local forerunner of the Austrian Green Party in Vienna
 Andrew Lloyd Webber, British composer of musical theatre
 American League West, one of the six divisions of Major League Baseball in the United States
 A-League Women, the top level professional women's football league in Australia